The list of International Court of Justice cases includes contentious cases and advisory opinions brought to the International Court of Justice since its creation in 1946. Forming a key part of international law, 181 cases have been entered onto the General List for consideration before the court.

The jurisdiction of the ICJ is limited.  Only states have standing to bring a compulsory claim against another state, and then only with the consent of the responding state.  However, certain United Nations bodies and agencies such as the UN General Assembly have the power to submit questions for advisory opinions. Although these advisory opinions are not binding under international law, they do provide the ICJ's interpretation of what international law is.

List of cases 
The list is organized by and includes only those disputes assigned a General List number by the registrar of the court.  In the early days of the court, any formally correct application was accepted by the registrar and entered on to the General List.  If there was no jurisdiction (because of lack of consent by the responding party), the case was soon closed by the court.  In 1978, however, the Court amended its rules and instructed the registrar to only enter a case on the General List if there was consent by the responding party, seemingly reducing the problem of meritless applications.  However, at times consent and therefore jurisdiction is contested by the responding party.  Such a case may be ordered to be added to the General List over the protestations of the respondent to allow the court to decide whether there is consent.  In such a situation, however, the mere addition of a dispute to the General List does not have legal significance.

See also
 Lists of case law
 United Nations Security Council resolution

References

External links
International Court of Justice official list of cases

International Court of Justice